Limatulichthys nasarcus is a species of catfish in the family Loricariidae. It is native to South America, where it occurs in the middle Ventuari River and the lower Caura River in the Orinoco drainage basin in Venezuela. The species reaches 15.1 cm (5.9 inches) in standard length. Its specific epithet, nasarcus, is derived from Latin and means "bow-shaped snout", referring to the species' snout, which is more rounded than that of its congener Limatulichthys griseus.

References 

Loricariidae
Freshwater fish of South America
Fish described in 2014